Flordeliz "Gigi" Osler  (born September 9, 1968) is a Canadian Senator, physician, and assistant professor at the University of Manitoba. She was the 2018–2019 President of the Canadian Medical Association.

Early life and education 
Osler was born in Winnipeg, Manitoba. Her mother was a nurse from the Philippines and her father was an Indian physician. As a child she lived on-site in the Riverview Health Centre. She is the great-great-grand niece-in-law of William Osler by marriage.

She studied medicine at the University of Manitoba and graduated in 1992. She remained there to specialize in head and neck surgery and graduated from residency in 1997. Thereafter, she completed a rhinology position at St. Paul's Hospital Vancouver, specializing in endoscopic sinus surgery. Osler later recounted that in the 1990s "surgery was still very much a male-dominated field. I was told, ‘Surgery’s too tough. You should look at pediatrics.’"

Career 
Osler is the current Head of the Section of Otolaryngology-Head and Neck Surgery at St. Boniface Hospital and is an Assistant Professor with the Department of Otolaryngology at the University of Manitoba College of Medicine.

In 2011, she volunteered with the Canadian Helping Kids in Vietnam's medical mission to Long Xuyên, which focused on delivering medical equipment and educating Vietnamese doctors and nurses. She has also been part of several missions to train surgeons in Africa and has spent several years in Mbarara. She has been an invited faculty member at the Mbarara University of Science and Technology.

In 2017, Dr. Osler defended the practice of "income sprinkling", which allows high-earning professionals and business owners to reduce taxes by distributing income to family members who may do minimal work.

In 2018, Osler was announced as the president of the Canadian Medical Association. She has been a member of the Royal College of Physicians and Surgeons of Canada Regional Advisory Committee. She is also a Fellow of the Royal College.

On September 26, 2022, Osler was appointed to the Senate of Canada by the office of Prime Minister Justin Trudeau. On January 10, 2023, Osler joined the Canadian Senators Group.

Physician health 
Osler believes that maintaining the health and wellness of oneself should be incorporated into medical training. In 2015, Osler co-chaired the Canadian Conference on Physician Health.

Personal life 
Osler is married and has two children.

References

External links 
 Osler's inaugural address as the President of CMA

1968 births
Living people
21st-century women physicians
21st-century Canadian physicians
Canadian politicians of Filipino descent
Canadian politicians of Indian descent
Canadian people of Filipino descent
Canadian people of Indian descent
Canadian women academics
Canadian women physicians
People from Winnipeg
University of Manitoba alumni
Women in Manitoba politics
Canadian senators from Manitoba
Canadian Senators Group
Independent Canadian senators
Women members of the Senate of Canada
Fellows of the Royal College of Physicians and Surgeons of Canada